The 1905 municipal election was held December 11, 1905 for the purpose of electing a mayor and four aldermen to sit on the Edmonton City Council, as well as five public school trustees and five separate school trustees.  This was the second election to be held since Edmonton became a city.

There were eight aldermen on city council. Two of the positions were already filled: John R. Boyle and Thomas Bellamy were both elected to two-year terms in 1904 and were still in office (Boyle had been elected MLA in the 1905 provincial election and would resign as alderman in March 1906).  

Aldermen Charles May and Kenneth McLeod had resigned partway through their two-year terms. Their seats would be filled after the election by appointment of the two most popular unsuccessful candidates - Robert Mays and David Latta. Amendments to the city charter were passed by the Legislature in early 1906. Thereafter, vacant seats were filled by a by-election or as part of a general municipal election. 

On March 7, 1906, Alderman Boyle resigned from council. Since his term was not due to expire until December, the city held a by-election on June 1. John Calhoun defeated John McLennan and C.V. Semerad and was elected to serve out Boyle's term. The vote tallies were Calhoun 188, McLennan 187, Semerad 146.

Electoral system
The mayor was elected through First-past-the-post voting.

The aldermen were elected through Plurality block voting, where each voter could cast up to four votes.

Voter turnout

There were 993 ballots cast out of 1900 eligible voters, for a voter turnout of 52.3%.

Results

(bold indicates elected, italics indicate incumbent)

Mayor

Charles May - 627
Arthur Cushing - 355

Aldermen
Four seats were to be filled

William Antrobus Griesbach - 536
Robert Manson - 477
Samuel Smith - 324
Joseph Henri Picard - 299
Robert Mays - 296
David Latta - 250
William Clark - 237
A York - 228
Peter Butchart - 210
Daniel Fraser - 167
John Calhoun - 124
George Sanderson - 121

Two aldermen appointed
Following the election, the two most popular unsuccessful candidates in the aldermanic election - Robert Mays and David Latta - were named by council to fill the two seats left empty by the resignation of Charles May and Kenneth McLeod. May and McLeod had been elected for two years in 1904 but had resigned prior to the end of the first year in office. May had resigned to run for mayor.

Aldermanic candidates' platforms
A. York said he was in favour of a better police force and fire brigade. "More should be hired and better pay offered. I stand strongly for municipal ownership of public utilities. The city currently has too many commissioners, One should be enough."

P.E. Butchart said he favoured municipal ownership of public utilities and also of making them the very best available, and would give all the aid he could to the betterment of the city's electric, light, telephone and waterworks systems. "I believe that having the executive work in connection with city government done by commissioners is the correct idea but the powers of the council and the commissioners should be more clearly defined, the council always being the governing body."
He said vacancies occurring in the council should be filled by the people (by election, not by appointment as was done to fill the empty seats of Charles May and Kenneth McLeod).

York and Butchart signed Clark's nomination papers. Four seats being filled, the candidates were not in direct competition.

Public school trustees

W D Ferris, H A Gray, A E May, Alex Taylor, and Hedley C. Taylor were elected.  Detailed results are no longer available.

Separate (Catholic) school trustees

Nicolas Dubois Dominic Beck, J Bilodeau, Wilfrid Gariépy, Joseph Henri Picard, and O Tessier were elected.  Detailed results are no longer available.

References

City of Edmonton: Edmonton Elections

1905
1905 elections in Canada
1905 in Alberta